"High Rollers" is a 1988 single by Ice-T, from his second album Power. The song has an anti street hustler message which was interpreted as having the opposite message, possibly as a result of misinterpretation of the context of the title, and ignorance as to the actual lyrical content. The song also has a music video.

Track listing

Side A
"High Rollers" (remix)
"The Hunted Child" (instrumental)
"The Hunted Child" (A Cappella)

Side B
"The Hunted Child" (remix)
"Power" (remix)
"Power" (instrumental)

References

External links
 https://www.youtube.com/watch?v=IomqS14tX_o

1988 singles
Ice-T songs
1988 songs
Songs written by Ice-T
Sire Records singles
Gangsta rap songs
Songs written by Afrika Islam